Tri Nagar Assembly constituency is one of the seventy Delhi assembly constituencies of Delhi in northern India. Tri Nagar assembly constituency is a part of Chandni Chowk (Lok Sabha constituency).

Members of Legislative Assembly
Key

Election results

2020

2015

2013

2008

2003

1998

1993

References

Assembly constituencies of Delhi
Delhi Legislative Assembly